The Sextental is a side valley of the Puster Valley in South Tyrol, Italy and is congruent with the municipality of Sexten. The Kreuzbergpass connects it with the Comelico valley to the southeast.

References
Tourism agency of Sexten

External links

Valleys of South Tyrol